McCarr is an unincorporated community and census-designated places in Pike County, Kentucky, United States.

Demographics

References

Unincorporated communities in Pike County, Kentucky
Unincorporated communities in Kentucky
Census-designated places in Pike County, Kentucky
Census-designated places in Kentucky